Western Water Park is a water park, located in Magaluf, Mallorca, Spain. The park consists of three areas: Western Land, Indian Town and El Paso. The park has the eleventh-highest slide in the world named The Beast together with El Salto del Diablo (The Devil's Drop) in Aquarama.

History 
In 1987 the park was inaugurated with the name El Dorado. It did not have any water attractions until 2002, when a series of water attractions, swimming pools, and finally slides, were added. Before, the park also had a show with birds of prey, but management concluded it was not in line with the parks setting and thus the birds were moved to Marineland in Mallorca.

Visitors  
About 50 percent of the parks visitors are from England, followed by the residents of Mallorca and subsequently Germany, Russia and Italy. The park is visited by 3,000 to 4,000 people daily. In 2010 250,000 people visited the park.

Attractions

Adrenaline Fun 
 El Látigo
 Cola del Diablo
 Tornado
 Tijuana Twins
 The Beast
 Boomerang
 Crazy Horses

Family Fun 
 Tam Tam Splash
 Huracán
 Big Hole
 Gran Cañón

Kidzworld 
 La Ponderosa
 Daky Park
 Coyote Park
 El Álamo

Chill Out & Play 
 Wild River
 Bath House
 Cascada
 Chorros

References

Water parks in Spain